502 Squadron may refer to:
 No. 502 Squadron RAF, of the Royal Air Force
 502 Squadron (Portugal), of the Portuguese Air Force